The megamouth shark (Megachasma pelagios) is a species of deepwater shark. It is rarely seen by humans and is the smallest of the three extant filter-feeding sharks alongside the relatively larger whale shark and basking shark. Since its discovery in 1976, fewer than 100 specimens have been observed or caught. Like the other two planktivorous sharks, it swims with its mouth wide open, filtering water for plankton and jellyfish. It is recognizable from its large head with rubbery lips. The megamouth is so unlike any other type of shark that it is usually considered to be the sole extant species in the family Megachasmidae, though some scientists have suggested it may belong in the family Cetorhinidae.

Description

The appearance of the megamouth is distinctive, but little else is known about it. It has a brownish-black colour on top, is white underneath, and has an asymmetrical tail with a long upper lobe, similar to that of the thresher shark. The interior of its gill slits are lined with finger-like gill rakers that capture its food. A relatively poor swimmer, the megamouth has a soft, flabby body and lacks caudal keels. The megamouth is considerably less active than the other filter-feeding sharks, the basking shark and the whale shark. The megamouth has a stout body and a long, wide bulbous head.

Weights of up to  have been reported. A 2019 study suggested that it would have reached  in maximum length. Megamouth sharks can be found as far northward as northern Japan; southern California (LACM 43745-1) and near Punta Eugenia, Baja California, and Hawaii. Megamouth sharks can be found at a depth of up to 1,000 m (3,280 ft). Megamouth sharks are dark blue, brownish-black, or gray above, lighter below; with a white band along the upper jaw; while the posterior margin of its fins are white.

As their name implies, megamouths have a large mouth with small teeth, and a broad, rounded snout, causing observers to occasionally mistake the megamouth for a young orca. The protruding inside of the upper lip is a brilliant silvery-white, which is very visible when the mouth is open. This lip was initially thought to be possibly embedded by luminous photophores when the first shark was examined in the early 1980s, which may act as a lure for plankton, while the team examining the second shark in the mid-1980s instead proposed that the lower lip might glow with the white band used as a reflector of sorts, but neither theory has been proven. In 2020, a study concluded that this species of shark does not in fact produce any light; the white band was found to merely be highly reflective of light. This white band is present in both sexes and could be either a feeding mechanism or possibly be used as a means of identifying other individuals of megamouth sharks. Megamouth sharks have up to 50 rows of teeth in their upper-jaw and up to 75 rows of teeth in their lower-jaw.

Taxonomy and evolution 
Researchers have predicted the feeding patterns of megamouth sharks in relation to the other two planktivorous sharks; the three plankivourous sharks have ram feeding in common, as it evolved from ram feeding swimming-type ancestors that developed their filtering mechanism to capture small prey like plankton. In addition to the living M. pelagios, however, two extinct megamouth species – the Priabonian M. alisonae and the Oligocene–Miocene M. applegatei – have also recently been proposed on the basis of fossilized tooth remains. An early ancestor of the recent species Megachasma pelagios was reported from the early Miocene (Burdigalian) of Belgium. However, the Cretaceous-aged M. comanchensis has been recently reclassified as an odontaspid shark in the genus Pseudomegachasma, and is in fact unrelated to the megamouth shark despite similar teeth morphology. The megamouth's filter-feeding adaptations likely evolved independently from other extant filter-feeding sharks, even the lamniform basking shark, making it an example of convergent evolution.

Behavior 
In 1990, a 4.9-m (16-foot) male megamouth shark was caught near the surface off Dana Point, California. This individual was eventually released with a small radio tag attached to its soft body. The tag relayed depth and time information over a two-day period. This pattern of vertical migration is seen in many marine animals as they track the movement of plankton in the water column.

Reproduction
Reproduction is ovoviviparous, meaning that the young sharks develop in eggs that remain within the mother's body until they hatch. Tissue samples were obtained from twenty-seven megamouths caught in a two-year period off the Hualien coast (eastern Taiwan), and two caught in Baja California, Mexico, and samples taken from GenBank to perform a population genetic analyses of the megamouth shark; the results indicated no genetic diversity between populations found in different geographical locations, which indicates the species forms a single, highly migratory, interbreeding population.

Discovery
The first megamouth shark was captured on November 15, 1976, about 25 miles northeast of Kahuku, Hawaii, when it became entangled in the sea anchor of United States Navy ship AFB-14 at a depth of about 165 m (541 ft) in water about 4,600 m (15,092 ft) deep. The species was identified as being of a new genus within the planktivorous shark species. Examination of the 4.5-m (14.7-ft), 750-kg (1,650-lb) specimen by Leighton Taylor showed it to be an entirely unknown type of shark, making it – along with the coelacanth – one of the more sensational discoveries in 20th-century ichthyology. The pectoral fin of the megamouth shark was studied, along with its skeletal and muscular system, to show its phylogenetic relationship to the other two sharks.

Known specimens

, only 99 megamouth specimens had been caught or sighted. They have been found in the Pacific, Atlantic, and Indian Oceans. Japan, the Philippines and Taiwan have each yielded at least 10 specimens, the most of any single area, amounting to more than half the worldwide total. Specimens have also been sighted in or come out of the waters near Hawaii, California, Mexico, Indonesia, Australia, Brazil, Senegal, South Africa, Puerto Rico, Ecuador, and possibly Vietnam.

See also

References

External links

 
 FishBase info for megamouth shark
 Elasmo Research pages on megamouth
 Florida Museum of Natural History pages on megamouth
 Video of human encounter with megamouth – YouTube
 Philippine fisherman catch and eat a megamouth shark
 Taipei Times – Taiwan quick take, Taitung fisherman catches rare megamouth.
 Wildlife Online – Natural History of the Megamouth Shark
 Sharkman's World Organization – Full list of Megamouth Sharks
 Megamouth Shark # 38: The First Megamouth Shark, Megachasma pelagios, Found in Mexican Waters, Florida Museum of Natural History

Megachasmidae
Ovoviviparous fish
Taxa named by Leighton R. Taylor
Taxa named by Leonard Compagno
Taxa named by Paul J. Struhsaker
Fish described in 1983